The Nimanburu were an Aboriginal Australian people of the Kimberley region of Western Australia.

Language
The Nimanburu language was one of the Nyulnyulan languages. Their speech was described by other aboriginal informants as a 'heavy' dialect of the language spoken by the Warrwa.

Country
Their inland extension ran as far as the headwaters of that river.

People
Despite being territorially a coastal people, the Nimanburu refrained from seafaring, and were not known to employ rafts as other contiguous groups in the King Sound did.

Alternative names
 Nimanboro, Nimanbur, Ninambur.
 Wadiabulu. (Nyigina exonym).

Notes

Citations

Sources

Aboriginal peoples of Western Australia
Kimberley (Western Australia)